McFarlin Memorial Auditorium is a proscenium style theatre located on the campus of Southern Methodist University. The venue seats 2,386 on three levels. The building is the third oldest on SMU's campus and has hosted a number of notable acts.

History
By the early 1920s, the students, faculty and staff of SMU had severely outgrown the capacity of Dallas and Clements Halls. Arguments were put forth as to what the next campus building should be. In the end, President Selecman and the Methodist bishops made the decision to build a chapel/auditorium as SMU's third permanent building. Financing was secured by a generous donation from devout Methodist and San Antonio businessman Robert M. McFarlin.

The McFarlin Memorial Auditorium was opened in 1926 to fulfill the University's pressing need for a chapel that could accommodate the entire student body. The building has evolved over time and continues to serve the University in the manner envisioned by SMU President Charles Selecman as "a place where we can have our friends from the community and elsewhere gather together on great occasions."

Though historically attractive, technology and ambiance are priorities as the university continues to keep the facility current. Recent projects include restoration of the main lobby to its historic integrity, renovation of restrooms, installation of a sprung floor on stage, and a complete reupholster of the auditorium's seats.

Notable events

Speakers
Winston Churchill
George Clinton
Charlton Heston
Bob Hope
Martin Luther King Jr.
Margaret Thatcher
Stephen Hawking
George H. W. Bush
George W. Bush
Ruth Bader Ginsburg

Performers
Arlo Guthrie
Barry Manilow
Billy Joel
Billy Thorpe
Blondie
Conan O'Brien
Dashboard Confessional
Death Cab for Cutie
The Doors
Ebi
Elton John
Evanescence
George Benson
The Grateful Dead
Hall & Oates
Imogen Heap
Jackopierce
James Taylor
Jane's Addiction
Jeff Beck
Jesse Colin Young
Jimmy Buffett
The Kinks
The McElroys
Outlaws
Paul Simon
Pink Floyd
The Police
Prince
Queen
Randy Newman
Shadmehr Aghili
Shawn Mendes
Sheryl Crow
Thin Lizzy
Wilco
Yo-Yo Ma

See also

National Register of Historic Places listings in Dallas County, Texas

References

External links

 McFarlin Auditorium Lobby Renovation

Southern Methodist University
Theatres in Texas
Music venues in Dallas
Concert halls in Texas
Music venues in Texas
National Register of Historic Places in Dallas
Theatres on the National Register of Historic Places in Texas